A list of populated places in Antalya Province, Turkey by district:

Akseki

Akseki, Antalya
Akşahap, Akseki
Alaçeşme, Akseki
Aşağıaşıklar, Akseki
Bademli, Akseki
Belenalan, Akseki
Bucakalan, Akseki
Bucakkışla, Akseki
Büyükalan, Akseki
Ceceler, Akseki
Cemerler, Akseki
Cendeve, Akseki
Cevizli, Akseki
Değirmenlik, Akseki
Dikmen, Akseki
Dutluca, Akseki
Emiraşıklar, Akseki
Erenyaka, Akseki
Geriş, Akseki
Geriş-bucak merkezi, Akseki
Gümüşdamla, Akseki
Güneykaya, Akseki
Günyaka, Akseki
Güzelsu, Akseki
Güçlüköy, Akseki
Hocaköy, Akseki
Hüsamettinköy, Akseki
Karakışla, Akseki
Kepez, Akseki
Kepezbeleni, Akseki
Kuyucak, Akseki
Mahmutlu, Akseki
Menteşbey, Akseki
Minareli, Akseki
Pınarbaşı, Akseki
Sadıklar, Akseki
Salihler, Akseki
Sarıhacılar, Akseki
Sarıhaliller, Akseki
Sinanhoca, Akseki
Susuzşahap, Akseki
Süleymaniye, Akseki
Taşlıca, Akseki
Yarpuz, Akseki
Çaltılıçukur, Akseki
Çanakpınar, Akseki
Çimiköy, Akseki
Çukurköy, Akseki
Çınardibi, Akseki

Alanya

Akdam, Alanya
Akçatı, Alanya
Alacami, Alanya
Alanya
Aliefendi, Alanya
Asmaca, Alanya
Avsallar, Alanya
Bademağacı, Alanya
Basırlı, Alanya
Bayır, Alanya
BayırKöy, Alanya
Bayırkozağacı, Alanya
Başköy, Alanya
Beldibi, Alanya
Beyreli, Alanya
Bucakköy, Alanya
Burçaklar, Alanya
Büyükpınar, Alanya
Bıçakçı, Alanya
Cikcilli, Alanya
Demirtaş, Alanya
Dereköy, Alanya
Deretürbelinas, Alanya
Değirmendere, Alanya
Elikesik, Alanya
Emişbeleni, Alanya
Esentepe, Alanya
Fakırcalı, Alanya
Gözübüyük, Alanya
Gözüküçüklü, Alanya
Gümüşgöze, Alanya
Gümüşkavak, Alanya
Güneyköy, Alanya
Güzelbağ, Alanya
Hacıkerimler, Alanya
Hacımehmetli, Alanya
Hocalar, Alanya
Karakocalı, Alanya
Karamanlar, Alanya
Karapınar, Alanya
Kargıcak, Alanya
Kayabaşı, Alanya
Kestel, Alanya
Keşefli, Alanya
Kocaoğlanlı, Alanya
Konaklı, Alanya
Kuzyaka, Alanya
Kızılcaşehir, Alanya
Mahmutlar, Alanya
Mahmutseydi, Alanya
Oba, Alanya
Obaalacami, Alanya
Payallar, Alanya
Paşaköy, Alanya
Saburlar, Alanya
Sapadere, Alanya
Seki, Alanya
Soğukpınar, Alanya
Süleymanlar, Alanya
Taşbaşı, Alanya
Toslak, Alanya
Tosmur, Alanya
Türkler, Alanya
Türktaş, Alanya
Tırılar, Alanya
Ulugüney, Alanya
Uzunöz, Alanya
Uğrak, Alanya
Uğurlu, Alanya
Yalçı, Alanya
Yaylakonak, Alanya
Yaylalı, Alanya
Yenice, Alanya
YeniceKöyü, Alanya
Yeniköy, Alanya
Yeşilöz, Alanya
Çakallar, Alanya
Çamlıca, Alanya
Çıplaklı, Alanya
Öteköy, Alanya
Özvadi, Alanya
Üzümü, Alanya
İmamlı, Alanya
İncekum, Alanya
İshaklı, Alanya
İspatlı, Alanya
Şıhlar, Alanya

Antalya

Akdamlar, Konyaaltı
Akkoç, Döşemealtı
Aksu, Antalya
Alaylı, Antalya
Antalya
Aşağıkaraman, Konyaaltı
Aşağıoba, Döşemealtı
Bademağacı, Antalya
Bahtılı, Konyaaltı
Başköy, Antalya
Bıyıklı, Döşemealtı
Camili, Döşemealtı
Dereli, Döşemealtı
Duacı, Antalya
Dumanlar, Antalya
Fettahlı, Antalya
Gaziler, Antalya
Geyikbayırı, Konyaaltı
Gökdere, Antalya
Göloluk, Antalya
Hacısekiler, Antalya
Hisarçandır, Konyaaltı
Ilıcaköy, Antalya
Karataş, Döşemealtı
Karatepe, Antalya
Karaçallı, Antalya
Kayadibi, Antalya
Kemerağzı, Antalya
Kevşirler, Döşemealtı
Killik, Döşemealtı
Kirişçiler, Antalya
Kovanlık, Döşemealtı
Kurşunlu, Antalya
Kömürcüler, Döşemealtı
Kızıllı, Antalya
Odabaşı, Antalya
Selimiye, Döşemealtı
Solakköy, Antalya
Topallı, Antalya
Varsak, Antalya
Yarbaşıçandırı, Konyaaltı
Yağca, Döşemealtı
Yenidumanlar, Antalya
Yeşilkaraman, Antalya
Çamlıca, Antalya
Çağlarca, Konyaaltı
Çitdibi, Antalya
Çıplaklı, Antalya
Özlü, Antalya
Üçoluk, Konyaaltı
İhsaniye, Antalya

Demre

Belören, Demre
Beymelek, Demre
Davazlar, Demre
Demre
Gürses, Demre
Kaleüçağız, Demre
Kapaklı, Demre
Köşkerler, Demre
Yavu, Demre
Çağman, Demre
Çevreli, Demre

Döşemealtı

Ahırtaş, Döşemealtı
Döşemealtı

Elmalı

Afşar, Elmalı
Ahatlı, Elmalı
Akçainiş, Elmalı
Akçay, Elmalı
Armutlu, Elmalı
Bayralar, Elmalı
Bayındır, Elmalı
Beyler, Elmalı
Bozhüyük, Elmalı
Büyüksöyle, Elmalı
Dereköy, Elmalı
Düdenköy, Elmalı
Elmalı, Antalya
Eskihisar, Elmalı
Eymir, Elmalı
Geçitköy, Elmalı
Geçmen, Elmalı
Gökpınar, Elmalı
Gölova, Elmalı
Göltarla, Elmalı
Gümüşyaka, Elmalı
Hacımusalar, Elmalı
Hacıyusuflar, Elmalı
Imırcık, Elmalı
Karaköy, Elmalı
Karamık, Elmalı
Kocapınar, Elmalı
Kuzköy, Elmalı
Kuzuköy, Elmalı
Küçüksöyle, Elmalı
Küçüksöğle, Elmalı
Kızılca, Elmalı
Kışlaköy, Elmalı
Macun, Elmalı
Mursal, Elmalı
Müren, Elmalı
Ovacık, Elmalı
Pirhasanlar, Elmalı
Salur, Elmalı
Sarılar, Elmalı
Tavullar, Elmalı
Tekkeköy, Elmalı
Yakaçiftlikköyü, Elmalı
Yanlızdam, Elmalı
Yapraklı, Elmalı
Yörenler, Elmalı
Yılmazlı, Elmalı
Zümrütova, Elmalı
Çaybaşı, Elmalı
Çobanisa, Elmalı
Çukurelma, Elmalı
Özdemir, Elmalı
İmircik, Elmalı
İslamlar, Elmalı

Finike

Akçaalan, Finike
Alacadağ, Finike
Arifköy, Finike
Asarönü, Finike
Boldağ, Finike
Dağbağ, Finike
Finike
Gökbük, Finike
Gökçeyaka, Finike
Günçalı, Finike
Hasyurt, Finike
Yanlız, Finike
Yazır, Finike
Yeşilköy, Finike
Yuvalılar, Finike
Çamlıbel, Finike

Gazipaşa

Akoluk, Gazipaşa
Aydıncık, Gazipaşa
Beyobası, Gazipaşa
Beyrebucak, Gazipaşa
Doğanca, Gazipaşa
Esenpınar, Gazipaşa
Gazipaşa
Gökçebelen, Gazipaşa
Gökçesaray, Gazipaşa
Göçük, Gazipaşa
Güneyköy, Gazipaşa
Gürçam, Gazipaşa
Hasdere, Gazipaşa
Ilıcaköy, Gazipaşa
Kahyalar, Gazipaşa
Karalar, Gazipaşa
Karatepe, Gazipaşa
Karaçukur, Gazipaşa
Korubaşı, Gazipaşa
Küçüklü, Gazipaşa
Kırahmetler, Gazipaşa
Kızılgüney, Gazipaşa
Macarköy, Gazipaşa
Muzkent, Gazipaşa
Sugözü, Gazipaşa
Yakacık, Gazipaşa
Yenigüney, Gazipaşa
Yeniköy, Gazipaşa
Yeşilyurt, Gazipaşa
Zeytinada, Gazipaşa
Çakmak, Gazipaşa
Çalıpınar, Gazipaşa
Çamlıca, Gazipaşa
Çile, Gazipaşa
Çimenbağı, Gazipaşa
Çobanlar, Gazipaşa
Çörüş, Gazipaşa
Çığlık, Gazipaşa
Öznurtepe, Gazipaşa
Üçkonak, Gazipaşa
İnalköy, Gazipaşa
İnceğiz, Gazipaşa
Şahinler, Gazipaşa

Gündoğmuş

Akyarı, Gündoğmuş
Balkaya, Gündoğmuş
Bayırkozağacı, Gündoğmuş
Bayırköy, Gündoğmuş
Beden, Gündoğmuş
Burçaklar, Gündoğmuş
Eskibağ, Gündoğmuş
Gözübüyük, Gündoğmuş
Gümüşgöze, Gündoğmuş
Gündoğmuş, Antalya
Güneycik, Gündoğmuş
Güneyköy, Gündoğmuş
Güneyyaka, Gündoğmuş
Kalecik, Gündoğmuş
Karabul, Gündoğmuş
Karadere, Gündoğmuş
Karaisa, Gündoğmuş
Karaköy, Gündoğmuş
Karamanlar, Gündoğmuş
Kayabükü, Gündoğmuş
Kozağacı, Gündoğmuş
Köprülü, Gündoğmuş
Narağacı, Gündoğmuş
Orhanköy, Gündoğmuş
Ortakonuş, Gündoğmuş
Ortaköy, Gündoğmuş
Pembelik, Gündoğmuş
Senir, Gündoğmuş
Serinyaka, Gündoğmuş
Umutlu, Gündoğmuş
Yenice, Gündoğmuş
Yeniköy, Gündoğmuş
Çaltı, Gündoğmuş
Çamlıalan, Gündoğmuş
Çayırözü, Gündoğmuş
Çiçekoluk, Gündoğmuş

Kaş

Agullu, Kaş
Ahatlı, Kaş
Aklar, Kaş
Akörü, Kaş
Bayındır, Kaş
Beldibi, Kaş
Belenli, Kaş
Belkonak, Kaş
Bezirgan, Kaş
Boğazcık, Kaş
Cemre, Kaş
Dereköy, Kaş
Dirgenler, Kaş
Doğantaş, Kaş
Gelemiş, Kaş
Gökçeyazı, Kaş
Gökçeören, Kaş
Gömbe, Kaş
Gürsu, Kaş
Hacıoğlan, Kaş
Kalkan, Kaş
Karadağ, Kaş
Kasaba, Kaş
Kaş
Kemerköy, Kaş
Kınık, Kaş
Kızılağaç, Kaş
Ortabağ, Kaş
Ova, Kaş
Palamutköy, Kaş
Pınarbaşı, Kaş
Sahilkılıçlı, Kaş
Sarıbelen, Kaş
Sarılar, Kaş
Sinneli, Kaş
Sütleğen, Kaş
Uğrar, Kaş
Yaylakılıçlı, Kaş
Yaylapalamut, Kaş
Yeniköy, Kaş
Yeşilbarak, Kaş
Yeşilköy, Kaş
Yuvacık, Kaş
Çamlıköy, Kaş
Çamlıova, Kaş
Çataloluk, Kaş
Çavdır, Kaş
Çayköy, Kaş
Çerler, Kaş
Çeşmeköy, Kaş
Çukurbağ, Kaş
Üzümlü, Kaş
İkizce, Kaş
İslamlar, Kaş

Kemer

Beldibi, Konyaaltı
Beycik, Kemer
Göynük, Kemer
Kemer, Antalya
Kiriş, Kemer
Ovacık, Kemer
Tekirova, Kemer
Ulupınar, Kemer
Çamyuva, Kemer
Çıralı, Kemer

Konyaaltı

Konyaaltı

Korkuteli

Akyar, Korkuteli
Avdan, Korkuteli
Bahçeyaka, Korkuteli
Bayat, Korkuteli
Bayatbademleri, Korkuteli
Başpınar, Korkuteli
Beğiş, Korkuteli
Bozova, Korkuteli
Büyükköy, Korkuteli
Dereköy, Korkuteli
Esenyurt, Korkuteli
Garipçe, Korkuteli
Göçerler, Korkuteli
Gümüşlü, Korkuteli
Güzle, Korkuteli
Karabayır, Korkuteli
Karakuyu, Korkuteli
Karataş, Korkuteli
Kargalık, Korkuteli
Kargın, Korkuteli
Kayabaşı, Korkuteli
Kemerağzı, Korkuteli
Korkuteli
Kozağacı, Korkuteli
Köseler, Korkuteli
Küçükköy, Korkuteli
Küçüklü, Korkuteli
Kırkpınar, Korkuteli
Kızılaliler, Korkuteli
Kızılcadağ, Korkuteli
Leylekköyü, Korkuteli
Mamatlar, Korkuteli
Nebiler, Korkuteli
Osmankalfalar, Korkuteli
Söbüce, Korkuteli
Söğütcük, Korkuteli
Sülekler, Korkuteli
Tatköy, Korkuteli
Taşkesiği, Korkuteli
Ulucak, Korkuteli
Yakaköy, Korkuteli
Yalınlıgediği, Korkuteli
Yazır, Korkuteli
Yelten, Korkuteli
Yeşiloba, Korkuteli
Yeşilyayla, Korkuteli
Yukarıkaraman, Korkuteli
Çaykenarı, Korkuteli
Çomaklı, Korkuteli
Çukurca, Korkuteli
Çıvgalar, Korkuteli
İmecik, Korkuteli
İmrahor, Korkuteli

Kumluca

Adrasan, Kumluca
Altınyaka, Kumluca
Belen, Kumluca
Beykonak, Kumluca
Beşikçi, Kumluca
Büyükalan, Kumluca
Dereköy, Kumluca
Erentepe, Kumluca
Gölcük, Kumluca
Güzören, Kumluca
Hacıveliler, Kumluca
Hızırkahya, Kumluca
Karaağaç, Kumluca
Karacaören, Kumluca
Kavakköy, Kumluca
Kumluca, Antalya
Kuzca, Kumluca
Mavikent, Kumluca
Olimpos, Kumluca
Ortaköy, Kumluca
Salur, Kumluca
Sarıcasu, Kumluca
Toptaş, Kumluca
Yazır, Kumluca
Yenikışla, Kumluca
Yeşilköy, Kumluca
Çaltı, Kumluca
Çayiçi, Kumluca
İncircik, Kumluca

Manavgat

Ahmetler, Manavgat
Aksaz, Manavgat
Altınkaya, Manavgat
Aşağıışıklar, Manavgat
Ballıbucak, Manavgat
Belenobası, Manavgat
Bereket, Manavgat
Beydiğin, Manavgat
Boztepe, Manavgat
Bozyaka, Manavgat
Bucakşeyhler, Manavgat
Burmahan, Manavgat
Büklüce, Manavgat
Cevizler, Manavgat
Demirciler, Manavgat
Denizkent, Manavgat
Denizyaka, Manavgat
Değirmenli, Manavgat
Değirmenözü, Manavgat
Dikmen, Manavgat
Dolbazlar, Manavgat
Doğançam, Manavgat
Düzağaç, Manavgat
Evrenleryavşı, Manavgat
Evrenseki, Manavgat
Gaziler, Manavgat
Gebece, Manavgat
Gençler, Manavgat
Gültepe, Manavgat
Gündoğdu, Manavgat
Güzelyalı, Manavgat
Hacıali, Manavgat
Hacıisalı, Manavgat
Hacıobası, Manavgat
Halitağalar, Manavgat
Hatipler, Manavgat
Hocalar, Manavgat
Hocalı, Manavgat
Ilıca, Manavgat
Kadılar, Manavgat
Kalemler, Manavgat
Karabucak, Manavgat
Karabük, Manavgat
Karacalar, Manavgat
Karakaya, Manavgat
Karaöz, Manavgat
Kırkkavak, Manavgat
Kısalar, Manavgat
Kızılağaç, Manavgat
Kızıldağ, Manavgat
Kızılot, Manavgat
Manavgat, Antalya
Odaönü, Manavgat
Oymapınar, Manavgat
Parakende, Manavgat
Salur, Manavgat
Saraçlı, Manavgat
Sarılar, Manavgat
Sağırin, Manavgat
Sevinç, Manavgat
Seydiler, Manavgat
Side, Manavgat
Sülek, Manavgat
Sırtköy, Manavgat
Taşağıl, Manavgat
Taşkesiği, Manavgat
Tepeköy, Manavgat
Tilkiler, Manavgat
Ulukapı, Manavgat
Uzunkale, Manavgat
Uzunlar, Manavgat
Yalçıdibi, Manavgat
Yavrudoğan, Manavgat
Yaylaalan, Manavgat
Yeniköy, Manavgat
Yeşilbağ, Manavgat
Yukarıışıklar, Manavgat
Çakış, Manavgat
Çaltepe, Manavgat
Çamlıtepe, Manavgat
Çardak, Manavgat
Çavuş, Manavgat
Çayyazı, Manavgat
Çeltikçi, Manavgat
Çenger, Manavgat
Çolaklı, Manavgat
Örenşehir, Manavgat
Şişeler, Manavgat

Serik

Akbaş, Serik
Akçapınar, Serik
Alacami, Serik
Aşağıkocayatak, Serik
Aşağıoba, Serik
Aşağıçatma, Serik
Belek, Serik
Belkıs, Serik
Berendi, Serik
Bilginler, Serik
Bozdoğan, Serik
Boğazkent, Serik
Bucakköy, Serik
Burmahancı, Serik
Büğüş, Serik
Cumalı, Serik
Demirciler, Serik
Deniztepesi, Serik
Dikmen, Serik
Dorumlar, Serik
Eminceler, Serik
Eskiyürük, Serik
Etler, Serik
Gedik, Serik
Gökçepınar, Serik
Hacıosmanlar, Serik
Hasdümen, Serik
Hasgebe, Serik
Haskızılören, Serik
Kadriye, Serik
Karataş, Serik
Karıncalı, Serik
Kayaburnu, Serik
Kozan, Serik
Kozağaç, Serik
Kumköy, Serik
Kuşlar, Serik
Kırbaş, Serik
Nebiler, Serik
Pınarcık, Serik
Sarıabalı, Serik
Serik
Tekkeköy, Serik
Töngüşlü, Serik
Yanköy, Serik
Yeşilvadi, Serik
Yeşilyurt, Serik
Yukarıkocayatak, Serik
Yukarıçatma, Serik
Yumaklar, Serik
Zırlankaya, Serik
Çakallık, Serik
Çanakçı, Serik
Çandır, Serik
Çatallar, Serik
Üründü, Serik
Şatırlı, Serik

İbradı

Ormana, İbradı
İbradı

Recent development

According to Law act no 6360, all Turkish provinces with a population more than 750 000, were renamed as metropolitan municipality. All districts in those provinces became second level municipalities and all villages in those districts  were renamed as a neighborhoods . Thus the villages listed above are officially neighborhoods of Antalya.

External links
Turkstat

Antalya
List
Mediterranean Region, Turkey